Karinë is a village and a former municipality in the Elbasan County, central Albania. At the 2015 local government reform it became a subdivision of the municipality Peqin. The population at the 2011 census was 1,350. The municipality consists of the villages Karinë, Kazije, Rrozej, Progem, Sinametaj, Drangaj and Garunje.

References

Former municipalities in Elbasan County
Administrative units of Peqin
Villages in Elbasan County